Unzela is a genus of moths in the family Sphingidae. The genus was erected by Francis Walker in 1856.

Species
Unzela japix (Cramer, 1776)
Unzela pronoe H. Druce, 1894

Dilophonotini
Moth genera
Taxa named by Francis Walker (entomologist)